= Monolein =

- Monolein (protein) is a kind of protein
- Monolein (typeface) is a typeface distributed by T26 Digital Type Foundry, used in the Silicon Graphics graphic norm
